LA-27 and now known as LA-31 is a constituency of Azad Kashmir Legislative Assembly which is currently represented by the Ch Latif Akbar of PPP. It covers the area of Khawra in Muzaffarabad District of Azad Kashmir, Pakistan.

Election 2021

elections were held in this constituency on 21 July 2016.

Muzaffarabad District
Azad Kashmir Legislative Assembly constituencies